Only Lovers Left Alive is a 2013 fantasy comedy-drama film written and directed by Jim Jarmusch, starring Tilda Swinton, Tom Hiddleston, Mia Wasikowska, Anton Yelchin, Jeffrey Wright, Slimane Dazi and John Hurt. An international co-production of the United Kingdom and Germany, the film focuses on the romance between two vampires, and was nominated for the Palme d'Or at the 2013 Cannes Film Festival.

In 2016, the film was ranked among the BBC's 100 Greatest Films of the 21st Century by 177 critics around the world. In late 2019, it was named the fourth greatest film of the 2010s by The Hollywood Reporters chief film critic Todd McCarthy.

Plot
Married for centuries and now living half a world apart, two vampires wake as the sun goes down. Adam sits holding a lute, in his cluttered Detroit Victorian, as Eve wakes up in her bedroom in Tangier, surrounded by books. Rather than feeding on humans directly, they are dependent on local suppliers of the "good stuff," for fear of blood contaminated by the 21st century environment. Adam, still a famous musician, also fears exposure, visiting a local blood bank in the dead of night in disguise as "Dr. Faust", bribing "Dr. Watson" for his coveted O negative. Eve relies on their old friend, the author Christopher Marlowe, who faked his death in 1593 and now lives under the protection of a protégé.

Despite having influenced the careers of countless famous musicians and scientists, Adam has become withdrawn and suicidal. His desire to reconnect through his music is at odds with the danger of recognition as well as his contempt for the corrupt and foolish humans he refers to as 'zombies'. He spends his days recording his compositions on outdated studio equipment and lamenting the state of the modern world, whilst collecting vintage instruments. He pays Ian, a naïve young music fan, to procure vintage guitars and other assorted curiosities, including a custom-made wooden bullet with a brass casing he thinks of using to kill himself. Having acquired much scientific knowledge over the years, Adam has built contraptions to power his home and a vintage sports car with technology originally pioneered by Nikola Tesla. His reclusive nature adds to his mystique as a musician and composer; he is upset when some intrepid fans turn up on his doorstep. Ian promises to discreetly spread rumours about Adam living elsewhere to draw them away.

When Eve phones, she recognises Adam is despondent and decides to come to Detroit to comfort him. Soon after she arrives, Adam goes out for more blood, and she discovers his revolver hidden under the bed with the wooden bullet. Her vampire senses reveal to her that the bullet is new, and she is worried. Eve confronts Adam when he returns, chiding him for wasting the life and opportunities he has to enjoy and appreciate the good things in the world, as well as their relationship. They spend their nights cruising the empty streets of Detroit, listening to music and playing chess. Their idyll is shattered by the arrival of Eve's younger sister, Ava, from Los Angeles. Ava gorges herself on their stash of the "good stuff" and, hungry for excitement, persuades them to go out to a local club with Ian, where they hear Adam's music played by the band White Hills. Ava offers Ian a hit off the flask she secretly filled with blood and brought to the club, but Adam snatches it from her with supernatural speed and insists they leave. Before dawn, Ava kills Ian by drinking too much of his blood, and Adam kicks her out of the house.

Adam and Eve dispose of Ian's corpse in an acid pool in an abandoned factory. Ian's murder and the appearance of another group of Adam's fans at the house, compel the couple to hastily return to Tangier with only what they can carry onto the plane. Desperately hungry, they visit Marlowe and learn that their old friend and mentor has been poisoned by accidentally drinking contaminated blood. After they discuss how Marlowe secretly wrote most of Shakespeare's plays, Marlowe dies. Eve takes Adam's ready cash and leaves him with the promise of a gift. He is captivated by the music from a nearby club, where Lebanese singer Yasmine Hamdan is finishing a haunting song. Eve reappears with a beautiful oud, and as they sit together outdoors and contemplate their likely demise, they spot a pair of young lovers kissing. "What choice do we have?" Adam remarks, before the two of them apologetically approach the couple with the intent of drinking their blood.

Cast
 Tilda Swinton as Eve
 Tom Hiddleston as Adam
 Mia Wasikowska as Ava
 Anton Yelchin as Ian
 Jeffrey Wright as Dr. Watson
 Slimane Dazi as Bilal
 John Hurt as Christopher Marlowe
 Yasmine Hamdan as Yasmine
 White Hills as themselves

Production
In August 2010, Jarmusch said that Tilda Swinton, Michael Fassbender, Mia Wasikowska and John Hurt had agreed to join the film, described by Jarmusch in May 2011 as a "crypto-vampire love story" but he did not have financing yet. Financing the film was a difficult process for the director and he explained at the world premiere at the Cannes International Film Festival in May 2013 that, "it's getting more and more difficult for films that are a little unusual, or not predictable, or don't satisfy people's expectations of something".

Jarmusch revealed in 2014 that, after seven years of frustration, Swinton said "That's good news, it means that now is not the time. It will happen when it needs to happen". Jarmusch eventually received a US$7 million budget from the German NRW Filmstiftung (de). Producer Jeremy Thomas later said that Jarmusch is "one of the great American independent film-makers – he's the last of the line. People are not coming through like that any more".

In January 2012, Tom Hiddleston replaced Fassbender prior to filming. Shooting began in June 2012 in numerous locations, the Brush Park district of Detroit, Michigan, U.S., Tangier, Morocco, Hamburg and Cologne in Germany. Filming lasted seven weeks.

The film is one of several Jarmusch productions, with films such as Night on Earth, in which the action mainly occurs at night. Swinton stated after the film's release: "Jim is pretty much nocturnal, so the nightscape is pretty much his palette. There's something about things glowing in the darkness that feels to me really Jim Jarmusch. He's a rock star".

Soundtrack
Jarmusch's band SQÜRL, primarily responsible for the film's score, opens the film with a version of Wanda Jackson’s 1961 song "Funnel of Love". Other contributors to the soundtrack are Zola Jesus and Lebanese vocalist Yasmine Hamdan, while Dutch lute player Jozef van Wissem's compositions formed the core of the film's aural aesthetic. During the week of the soundtrack album's release, in April 2014, Van Wissem explained:

I know the way [Jarmusch] makes his films is kind of like a musician. He has music in his head when he’s writing a script so it’s more informed by a tonal thing than it is by anything else ... I feel that I’m sort of political. Jim’s film is anti-contemporary-society. And the lute goes against all technology and against all computers and against all the shit you don’t need.

Van Wissem also described the film as "a very personal film, maybe even autobiographical" and that "Jim is a cultural sponge, he absorbs everything". A concert was held at the Santos Party House venue in New York City in April 2014 to celebrate the release of Jarmusch's eleventh feature film. During the Santos event, Jesus performed with van Wissem on both a "pseudo-Gregorian" piece from the film's soundtrack and an unrecorded collaboration.

The list of songs:
 "Funnel of Love" - Wanda Jackson
 "Harissa" - Kasbah Rockers
 "Caprice No. 5 in A Minor" - Charles Yang (composed by Niccolò Paganini)
 "Gamil" - Y.A.S.
 "Can't Hardly Stand It" - Charlie Feathers
 "Trapped By a Thing Called Love" - Denise LaSalle
 "Soul Dracula" - Hot Blood
 "Under Skin Or By Name" - White Hills
 "Red Eyes and Tears" - Black Rebel Motorcycle Club
 "Little Village" - Bill Laswell
 "Hal" - Yasmine Hamdan

CD tracks:
Detroit	
1 SQÜRL – Streets Of Detroit - 0:35
2 SQÜRL – Funnel Of Love - 3:40
3 Jozef Van Wissem Et SQÜRL – Sola Gratia (Part 1) - 3:24
4 Jozef Van Wissem Et SQÜRL – The Taste Of Blood - 5:49
5 SQÜRL – Diamond Star - 1:14
6 SQÜRL – Please Feel Free To Piss In The Garden - 4:20
7 SQÜRL – Spooky Action At A Distance - 3:34
Tangier	
8 Jozef Van Wissem Et SQÜRL – Streets Of Tangier - 1:35
9 Jozef Van Wissem – In Templum Dei - 2:56
10 Jozef Van Wissem Et SQÜRL – Sola Gratia (Part 2) - 5:09
11 Jozef Van Wissem – Our Hearts Condemn Us - 4:35
12 Yasmine Hamdan – Hal  - 4:29
13 Jozef Van Wissem Et SQÜRL – Only Lovers Left Alive - 3:31
14 Jozef Van Wissem Et SQÜRL – This Is Your Wilderness - 3:51

Cultural references 
Jarmusch not only sees himself as a "film nerd", he has also been called "a cultural sponge" by van Wissem. This film is full of cultural references and therefore it has been praised as "intensely curated" and "an elegiac love song to aesthetic originary creation". Most of the hints are musical and others refer to science, literature or Jarmusch's work. The implicit vampires (Adam, Eve and Christopher) are sort of "secret agents of artistic and intellectual achievement throughout history", having created art for others like William Shakespeare or Franz Schubert (for whom Adam is said to have written the famous Adagio of the cello string quintet D956, the movement used by Jarmusch in his 2009 movie The Limits of Control.). Early in the film, Adam asserts that seventeenth century musician William Lawes was known for his funeral music, perhaps confusing him with Henry Purcell. Lawes wrote no funeral music, Purcell famously did.

The title
The title pays tribute to the Dave Wallis science fiction novel of the same name from 1964, although the plots have no similarities. A film adaptation was planned in the mid-1960s for director Nicholas Ray (a picture of him can later be seen in the movie) starring The Rolling Stones.

Names
The names "Adam" and "Eve" can easily be inferred to allude to the biblical creation story but in an interview for The Hollywood Reporter Jarmusch revealed he was originally referring to Mark Twain's satirical work The Diaries of Adam and Eve.

For her flight from Tangier to Detroit Eve uses the surname "Fibonacci", taken from the Italian mathematician Leonardo Fibonacci. On their flights to Tangier they use the names Stephen Dedalus (from James Joyce's A Portrait of the Artist as a Young Man and Ulysses) and Daisy Buchanan (from F. Scott Fitzgerald's The Great Gatsby).
On his two visits to Dr. Watson (Jeffrey Wright) Adam's name tags show "Dr. Faust" (from the German legend of Faust, from which Marlowe wrote the play The Tragical History of the Life and Death of Doctor Faustus) and "Dr. Caligari" (an homage to the German silent movie The Cabinet of Dr. Caligari). At the first visit, Watson calls him "Dr. Strangelove", which serves as a reference to the eponymous character in Stanley Kubrick's 1964 film Dr. Strangelove.

Music equipment and technology
Parallel to Adam's fondness for vintage instruments and audio equipment, Jarmusch originally planned shooting the movie on analog film; budgetary considerations however forced the use of a digital Arri Alexa Plus with Cooke S4 lenses. Only vinyl (mostly singles) are played and analogue recording is used. The film opens with a view of a ten-course renaissance lute (credited as built by Michael Schreiner of Toronto). Adam receives four guitars in the beginning from Ian:
 a white 1959 Supro (then manufactured by Valco), which he names after William Lawes
 a silverblue 1966 Hagström
 an "early sixties" Silvertone in black
 a red Gretsch 6120 "Chet Atkins"; Adam once saw Eddie Cochran play one

Later, a 1905 Gibson L2 is shown while other guitars, violins and cellos can be seen in Adam's studio. Among Adam's recording equipment is a Premier drum set, a Telefunken and Revox tape recorder, a Marshall and Fender amps. Eve and her sister are more adapted to modern technology. To communicate via Skype with her lover, Eve uses her iPhone while Adam sets up a laptop connected to a wood-cabinet tube television. Ava uses YouTube to watch the music video of "Soul Dracula" by the French band Hot Blood.

Literature
Among the books Eve reads and packs for her trip to Detroit are:
 Los Pequeños Poemas by Ramón de Campoamor y Campoosorio
 Endgame by Samuel Beckett
 Infinite Jest by David Foster Wallace
 Don Quixote by Miguel de Cervantes
 The Temple of the Golden Pavilion by Yukio Mishima
 The Bastard of Istanbul by Elif Şafak
 The Adventures of Captain Hatteras by Jules Verne
 Basquiat edited by Sam Keller and Dieter Buchhart
 Orlando Furioso by Ludovico Ariosto
 Zwischen zwei Revolutionen by Ernst Heilborn
 The Metamorphosis by Franz Kafka
 "Man of Paper", from روايات عبير  (Arabic versions of Harlequin novels) by Carole Mortimer
 A volume of the love poetry by the Arab poet Umar ibn Abi Rabi'ah
and a picture of Lorenzo Ghiberti's "La Creazione di Adamo e di Eva" from his Porta del Paradiso

Referring to the story that Christopher Marlowe may have faked his death and then written under the pseudonym of William Shakespeare, Marlow tells Eve that Adam would have been the perfect inspiration for his Hamlet.

Scientists and Inventors
The mentioned scientists Adam adores are: Pythagoras, Galileo Galilei, Nicolaus Copernicus, Isaac Newton, Nikola Tesla, Charles Darwin, and Albert Einstein.

Eve flies to Detroit on the fictional airline "Air Lumière" (see Auguste and Louis Lumière).

Wall of fame
While Adam often mentions that he has no "heroes", opposite his bed the wall is covered with pictures of personalities, which include
 musicians: Henry Purcell, Johann Sebastian Bach, Franz Schubert, Gustav Mahler, Charley Patton, Billie Holiday, Hank Williams, Bo Diddley, Thelonious Monk, John Coltrane, Patti Smith, Chrissie Hynde, Frank Zappa and Jimi Hendrix.
 among them the Jarmusch associates Tom Waits (Down by Law, Night on Earth, Mystery Train, Coffee and Cigarettes, and The Dead Don't Die), Iggy Pop (Dead Man, Coffee and Cigarettes, The Dead Don't Die), Joe Strummer (Mystery Train), RZA (Ghost Dog, Coffee and Cigarettes, and The Dead Don't Die) and Neil Young (Dead Man)
 writers: William Blake (mentioned in Dead Man), Christopher Marlowe, Lord Byron, Percy Bysshe Shelley, Mary Wollstonecraft, John Keats, Jane Austen, Edgar Allan Poe, Arthur Rimbaud, Emily Dickinson, Charles Baudelaire, Oscar Wilde, Franz Kafka, Mark Twain, Samuel Beckett and William S. Burroughs
 others: Isaac Newton, Nikola Tesla (the first which can be seen), Nicholas Ray, Luis Buñuel, Rodney Dangerfield, Buster Keaton, Rumi, Sitting Bull, Geronimo, Harpo Marx, Jean-Michel Basquiat and Marcel Duchamp

Places
The home of Adam is originally located at 82 Alfred Street, Detroit. When the protagonists are cruising around the neighbourhood, Adam shows Eve the Michigan Theater, which is now a parking deck, and the place where Jack White grew up with his family. (White previously played a Tesla expert in Coffee and Cigarettes.)

Release

In April 2013, the film was added to the 2013 Cannes Film Festival in the competition section. It was shown at several film festivals, such as the September 2013 Toronto International Film Festival, four screenings at the September/October 2013 Reykjavík International Film Festival, and as an opening film for the 4th American Film Festival held in Wrocław, Poland.

The film was officially released in the United Kingdom on 21 February 2014, and opened in the United States on 11 April 2014.

Reception

Critical response
Rotten Tomatoes, a review aggregator, gives the film an approval rating of 85%, based on 198 reviews, with an average rating of 7.46/10. The website's critical consensus states, "Worth watching for Tom Hiddleston and Tilda Swinton's performances alone, Only Lovers Left Alive finds writer-director Jim Jarmusch adding a typically offbeat entry to the vampire genre". Metacritic gave the film a weighted average score of 79 out of 100, based on 41 reviews, indicating "generally favorable reviews".

Scott A. Gray of Exclaim! gave the film 8 out of 10, calling it "a visually poetic love story with a wry, jaded sense of humour about finding reasons to wake up every night". Calum Marsh of Slant Magazine gave it 3 out of 4 stars. Jonathan Romney of Screen International commented that it is Jarmusch's most poetic film since Dead Man.

Todd McCarthy of The Hollywood Reporter described the film as "the perennial downtown filmmaker's best work in many years, probably since 1995's Dead Man, with which it shares a sense of quiet, heady, perilous passage." Jonathan Hatfull of SciFiNow wrote that it is Jarmusch's best film since Ghost Dog.

Robbie Collin from The Daily Telegraph awarded the film 4 out of 5 stars and praised the performances of Swinton and Hiddleston: "In the time-honoured Jarmuschian fashion, the few things that happen in Only Lovers Left Alive happen very slowly, but the dialogue is always gloomily amusing, and Swinton and Hiddleston's delivery of the gags is as cold and crisp as footsteps in fresh snow". Jessica Kiang of IndieWire gave the film a B+ grade, "the real pleasure of the film is in its languid droll cool and its romantic portrayal of the central couple, who are now our number one role models in the inevitable event of us turning vampiric".

Tim Grierson of Paste noted that "Hiddleston and Swinton play their characters not as blasé hipsters but, rather, deeply reflective, almost regretful old souls who seem to have decided that love is about the only thing you can count on". Peter Bradshaw of The Guardian gave the film 3 out of 5 stars, pointing that Adam and Eve look more like "well-born incestuous siblings" in spite of being lovers, while the Observer'''s Jonathan Romney concluded that the film is "a droll, classy piece of cinematic dandyism that makes the Twilight cycle redundant in one exquisitely languid stroke".

Kurt Halfyard of Twitch Film commented: "Retro recording equipment hasn't looked this claustrophobically sexy since Berberian Sound Studio". Alfred Joyner of International Business Times'' felt that "the melancholy that permeates Motown in the film could be seen as Jarmusch's take on the loss of America's greatness in the 21st century".

Accolades

References

External links
 
 
 
 
 
 

2013 films
2013 fantasy films
2013 independent films
2013 romantic comedy-drama films
2010s English-language films
2010s fantasy comedy-drama films
2010s French-language films
2010s horror drama films
2010s romantic fantasy films
Arabic-language films
British fantasy comedy-drama films
British horror drama films
British independent films
British romantic comedy-drama films
British romantic fantasy films
British supernatural horror films
British vampire films
English-language German films
Films directed by Jim Jarmusch
Films produced by Jeremy Thomas
Films set in Detroit
Films set in Tangier
Films shot in Cologne
Films shot in Detroit
Films shot in Michigan
German fantasy comedy-drama films
German independent films
German romantic comedy-drama films
German romantic fantasy films
German supernatural horror films
German vampire films
HanWay Films films
Marlovian theory of Shakespeare authorship
Sony Pictures Classics films
Recorded Picture Company films
Romantic horror films
Shakespeare authorship fiction
2010s British films
2010s German films